Barbodes bunau is a species of cyprinid fish native to Indonesia.

References 

Barbodes
Freshwater fish of Indonesia
Fish described in 2005